Háthayim Marine Provincial Park, formerly Von Donop Marine Provincial Park, is a provincial park in British Columbia, Canada, located on the north end of Cortes Island in the Discovery Islands.

The park's original name was derived from that of Von Donop Inlet (Klahoose: ha̓θamɩn ), which drains NW towards Sutil Channel from the northwest end of Cortes Island.  The inlet was named in 1863 by Captain Daniel Pender for Victor von Donop, who was a midshipman on board the 21-gun HMS Charybdis, under Captain the Hon. George Keane RN.  The vessel arrived at Esquimalt from China on March 23, 1862, with orders to protect the British colonies of the region at a time of mounting hostilities between England and the United States growing out of the Mason and Slidell affair resulting from the Trent Affair. Donop was later Sub-lieutenant of HMS Duncan from 1865 to 1866.  The 81-gun Duncan was the flagship of Vice-Admiral Sir James Hope of the North American Station, after whom Hope Island had been named in 1862. Donop later served as Lieutenant-Commander on the gunboat Cromer, from 1875 to 1877.

Victor von Donop came from a distinguished naval and military family and was the eldest son of Captain Edward von Donop. While serving as Lieutenant in command of the gunboat HMS Decoy, Donop was drowned on 12 February 1881 after being swept off the bridge when the ship rolled heavily in a violent storm.

References

Provincial parks of British Columbia
Maritime history of Canada
Cortes Island
1993 establishments in British Columbia
Protected areas established in 1993
Marine parks of Canada